Jari Vlak (born 15 August 1998) is a Dutch professional footballer who plays as a midfielder for Eredivisie club FC Emmen.

Club career
Vlak made his Eerste Divisie debut for Volendam on 5 October 2018 in a game against RKC Waalwijk, as a starter.

On 11 January 2021, Vlak signed a three-and-a-half year contract with Eredivisie club FC Emmen. He was eyed as a replacement of Michael Chacón, who had moved to Atlético Nacional.

Personal life
His older brother Gerry Vlak is also a footballer.

References

External links
 

Living people
1998 births
People from Volendam
Dutch footballers
Footballers from North Holland
FC Volendam players
FC Emmen players
Eerste Divisie players
Derde Divisie players
Eredivisie players
Association football midfielders